This is a timeline of the history of golf on television in the UK.

1930s to 1960s 
 1955
 The BBC broadcasts The Open Championship for the first time.

1970s 
 1970 
 No events.

 1971 
 No events.

 1972
 ITV shows the 1972 and 1973 Scottish Open.  The tournament is cancelled when television coverage could not be arranged in 1974.

 1973
 20–22 September –  Coverage of the Ryder Cup moves from the BBC to ITV. IYV also shows the 1975 and 1977 events.

 1974
 No events.

 1975
 No events.

 1976
 No events.

 1977
 ITV televises the Ryder Cup for the final time.

 1978 
 No events.

 1979 
 The 1979 ITV strike means that the 1979 Ryder Cup isn't televised in the UK.

1980s 
 1980 
 No events.

1981
 The BBC regains the rights to the Ryder Cup.

1982
 No events.

1983
 No events

1984
 No events.

1985
 No events.

 1986
 12–13 April – The BBC shows live coverage of the Masters for the first time, showing coverage of the final two rounds.

 1987
 9 April – Screensport broadcasts live coverage of the US Masters golf from Augusta. This co-insides with the channel also broadcasting regular coverage of PGA Tour events.
 9–12 July – The BBC shows live coverage of the Scottish Open for the first time, and continues to show the event live until 1993.

 1988
 No events.

 1989
 No events.

1990s 
 1990
 No events.

 1991
 No events.

 1992
 No events.

 1993
 Sky begins providing live coverage of the PGA Tour and the PGA European Tour.
 24–26 September – The BBC shows live coverage of the Ryder Cup for the final time.

 1994
 6–9 July – Sky Sports covers the Scottish Open for the first time. The event had previously been shown live on the BBC.

 1995
 22–24 September – Sky Sports becomes the exclusive broadcaster of the Ryder Cup and has shown the event exclusive live ever since.

 1996
 Sky Sports shows women’s golf for the first time.

 1997
 26-28 September – The BBC obtains the highlights rights to the Ryder Cup, and continues to do so to this day.

 1998
 No events.

 1999
 4–7 November – Sky Sports broadcasts live coverage of the first edition of the World Golf Championships and with the exception of the 2001 WGC-American Express Championship, which was broadcast on the BBC, Sky has been the exclusive broadcaster of the tournament ever since..

2000s 
 2000 to 2005
 No events.

 2006
 December – Sky's 13 years of covering golf's PGA Tour ends due to Setanta Sports winning the rights to coverage of the tour from the start of 2007.

 2007
 11 January – Following Setanta Sports’ purchase of rights to the PGA Tour, the company launches a dedicated golf channel Setanta Golf.
 31 December – The Golf Channel UK closes due to it not being able to attract a viable audience due to not broadcasting enough live tournaments.

 2008
 No events.

 2009
 23 June – Setanta Sports ceases broadcasting in the UK after going into administration. The closure means that Setanta Golf stops broadcasting.
 25 June – Eurosport picks up the television rights to golf's PGA Tour for the remainder of the 2009 season. However the coverage only lasts  for six months as the rights return to Sky Sports at the start of 2010.

2010s
2010
 January –  Sky Sports regains the rights to golf's PGA Tour.

2011
 7–10 April – Sky Sports shows coverage of golf's Masters Tournament for the first time. It shows the first two rounds exclusively live and shares coverage of rounds 3 and 4 with the BBC.
 November – ESPN shows two golf tournaments from Australia.

2012
 The BBC loses the rights to the Scottish Open, and BMW PGA Championship to Sky Sports. The BBC does retain the rights to show highlights of both events.

2013
 No events.

2014
 18 September-2 October –  Sky rebranded Sky Sports 4 as Sky Sports Ryder Cup to show its live coverage of the 2014 Ryder Cup, from Gleneagles. It is repeated from 26 September to 5 October 2016 for the Ryder Cup for that year. In 2018, Sky Sports Golf is rebranded to Sky Sports Ryder Cup to bring coverage of the 2018 tournament.

2015
 17–20 July – After 60 years, the BBC shows live coverage of The Open Championship for the final time as from next year, live coverage of the event transfers to Sky Sports although the BBC does continue to show two hours of highlights from all four days of the event.

2016
 11–18 July – During its first live broadcast of golf's Open Championship, Sky Sports 1 was rebranded as Sky Sports The Open. The following year sees Sky Sports 4 rebranded Sky Sports The Open and in subsequent years, Sky Sports The Open has appeared during the week in which the Open is held.

2017
 18–14 May – Sky rebrands Sky Sports 4 as Sky Sports The Players. The channel is dedicated to the coverage of the 2017 Players Championship. This is repeated on Sky Sports Golf for the 2018, 2019 and 2021 competitions, and also the 2020 competition prior to it being cancelled due to the COVID-19 pandemic. 
 18 July – Sky Sports is revamped with the numbered channels being replaced by sports-specific channels. One of the new channels is devoted to golf and is called Sky Sports Golf. 
 3–6 August – Sky Sports replaces the BBC as live broadcaster of the Women's British Open.

2018
 11–19 June 2018 – Sky rebrands Sky Sports Golf as Sky Sports US Open, dedicated to the coverage of the 2018 US Open.
 9–12 August – Eleven Sports broadcasts the 2018 PGA Championship, meaning that or the first time, a major golf event in the UK is only available on a streaming platform. However, the event returns to Sky Sports the following year.

2019
 12–13 April – The BBC shows live coverage of the Masters for the final time, airing live coverage of the final two rounds. Coverage of the entire event moves to Sky Sports. This brings to an end all live coverage of golf on the BBC.

2020s
 2020
 No events.

 2021
 No events.

References

golf on UK television
golf on UK television
golf on UK television
Sports television in the United Kingdom
golf on UK television
Golf in the United Kingdom